Joan Elizabeth Russow (born Ottawa, November 1, 1938) is a Canadian peace activist and former national leader of the Green Party of Canada from 1997 to 2001. She is also a co-founder of the Ecological Rights Association and the Global Compliance Research Project.

Early career
Russow received her BA in art history and a master's degree in education from the University of British Columbia. She received her Ph.D. from the University of Victoria in interdisciplinary studies.

Russow first gained attention in the "Lord's Prayer Case" which resulted in the banning of school prayer in public schools in British Columbia in 1989.

In collaboration with the professors in the Law faculty of the University of Toronto, Russow was the litigant in the Charter challenge of the first-past-the-post electoral system in Canada.

The Green Party and politics
Russow joined the Green Party in 1993 and became leader in 1997. She ran for a seat in the House of Commons of Canada in three federal elections; in Victoria in 1997 and 2000, and in Okanagan—Coquihalla in a by-election in September 2000. She lost all three elections.

Russow was the partner of David Scott White, the former chair of the Green Party of British Columbia, until his death in 2006. White was the manager of Russow's election campaign as leader of the federal Green party.

Under Russow's leadership the party developed policies promoting social justice, human rights, and peace, as well as the more traditional concerns with environment.

In the 2001 Quebec City protest against the Free Trade Area of the Americas, Russow was detained for taking a photograph of the jail that was being emptied to incarcerate the FTAA protesters. Russow promoted the Green Party as a leader in the anti-globalization movement, in particular the anti-corporatist and pro-peace movement.

Russow and White left the Green Party in 2001, partly due to the German Green party's support of the NATO attack on Serbia. Russow and White both joined the NDP in 2003 and White continued his work as an activist until his death, most recently researching and writing against Canada's military role in Afghanistan.

In 2005 Russow criticized the Green Party under Jim Harris for moving away from some of its original left-wing principles.

Legal activism
Russow is a co-founder of the Ecological Rights Association and the Global Compliance Research Project. In September 2007, she collaborated on a declaration related to climate change. This declaration called upon the Intergovernmental Panel on Climate Change to calculate the contribution of militarism to greenhouse gas emissions.

In March 2008, at the annual meeting of the United Nations Commission on the Status of Women, she collaborated on a paper related to the delegitimization of war; this paper was officially sanctioned for distribution to state delegations at the UN. 

On August 4, 2008, in Victoria she presented a representative of Stephen Harper with a paper entitled 95 Articles of Condemnation of the Harper Government.

International and domestic peace activism
Russow developed a "Common Security Index" which was submitted to the Senate Committee on the Anti-Terrorism Act on October 17, 2005. To further common security, the member states of the United Nations have made commitments to work toward the following goals:

 to enable socially equitable and environmentally sound employment, and ensure the right to development and social justice;
 to promote and fully guarantee respect for human rights including labour rights,  civil and political rights, social and cultural rights: the right to food, the right to housing, the right to safe drinking water and sewage, the right to education  and right to a universally accessible not for profit health care system;
 to ensure the preservation and protection of the environment, the respect for the inherent worth of nature beyond human purpose, the reduction of the ecological footprint and to move away from the current model of unsustainable and overconsumptive development;
 to achieve a state of peace and disarmament through reallocation of military expenses; and
 to create a global structure that respects the rule of law and the International Court of Justice.

Recently Russow has been speaking out about the increased militarism in Canada, focusing on the increased military budget; the increased belligerence in the military invasion and occupation of Afghanistan; the increased military exercises involving US nuclear-powered vessels and nuclear arms capable vessels and aircraft and using live ammunition; the increased military recruitment ads on television and bus shelters, in "Navy days" with booths, and in schools; the increased mining and production of uranium, including the contribution to US and NATO weapon systems; and the increased military flights overhead and participation in community events and parades.

In March 2007, Russow lobbied state delegations in the UN General Assembly to invoke Article 22 of the Charter of the United Nations to set up an international tribunal to try the Bush administration. On March 8, 2007, the petition, in the six official languages, was submitted to the office of the President of the UN General Assembly.

In 2008, Russow was involved in a film project related to Co-operatives titled Counterpoint to Corporatism.

For the 2009 Conference on Climate change in Copenhagen, she submitted a document co-written with Rickard Levicki of England to the state negotiators.

References

Sources
"The Globe and Mail Election 2000 Series" Retrieved 11 January 2007.
"PEJ Obituary David Scott White" Retrieved 11 January 2007.
"The Province Obituary David Scott White" Retrieved 11 January 2007.
The University of British Columbia Alumni Directory 1992. Vancouver, B.C. page 558.
"Lord's Prayer Case".
Proceedings of the Special Senate Committee on the Anti-terrorism Act.
Proposed Canadian No-fly list.
The Bush Regime must be judged by an International Tribunal.
Co-operatve film project

Green Party of Canada candidates in the 1997 Canadian federal election
Green Party of Canada candidates in the 2000 Canadian federal election
Green Party of Canada leaders
Female Canadian political party leaders
Canadian women in federal politics
Living people
1938 births
20th-century Canadian women politicians